The 2020 UNOH 188 was the 19th stock car race of the 2020 NASCAR Xfinity Series season, and the inaugural running of the race, after the COVID-19 pandemic forced NASCAR to move the series' Watkins Glen International race, the Zippo 200, to the Daytona International Speedway road course, a  permanent road course that uses part of the Daytona oval and infield road course. The race was held on Saturday, August 15, 2021, in Daytona Beach, Florida at the Daytona International Speedway road course. Austin Cindric of Team Penske would continue his dominance of road courses of the years and win the race, leading 21 laps. Brandon Jones of Joe Gibbs Racing and Noah Gragson of JR Motorsports would score the rest of the podium positions, finishing 2nd and 3rd, respectively.

On July 30, it was revealed after simulation testing revealed concerns of high speeds entering turn 1 (a turn already considered to be difficult among road racers), a temporary chicane was added in between the 4th turn of the oval and the entrance to pit road (similar to the Charlotte ROVAL). NASCAR further announced that it would use the high-downforce aero package used for the road course races in 2019 (in 2020, road courses were scheduled to use a low-downforce package similar to what was used in 2018 and what is used on ovals 1-mile or shorter in 2020). The addition of the chicane increased the length of the course from 3.56 to 3.61 miles and added a 13th and 14th turn to the original 12-turn layout.

Background

Entry list 

*Driver changed to Bobby Reuse for the race.

Starting lineup 
The starting lineup was based on a formula based on the previous race, the 2020 Henry 180. As a result, Austin Cindric of Team Penske would win the pole.

Race

Pre-race ceremonies

Race recap

Post-race driver comments

Race results 
Stage 1 Laps: 15

Stage 2 Laps: 15 

Stage 3 Laps: 22

References 

2020 NASCAR Xfinity Series
NASCAR races at Daytona International Speedway
August 2020 sports events in the United States
2020 in sports in Florida